These are the squad lists of the teams participating in the 1996 CONCACAF Gold Cup.

Group A

Guatemala
Head coach: Juan Ramón Verón

Mexico
Head coach:  Bora Milutinović

Saint Vincent and the Grenadines
Head coach:  Lenny Taylor

Group B

Brazil
Head coach:  Mario Zagallo

Canada
Head coach:  Bob Lenarduzzi

Honduras
Head coach:  Ernesto Rosa Guedes

Group C

El Salvador
Head coach:  José Omar Pastoriza

DF Carlos Edilberto Hernandez / / 19 Club Deportivo Aguila El Salvador                                                                                                                                                                                                                                     FW Oscar Armando Diaz 15/10/1970 Club Deportivo Municipal Limeño El Salvador

Trinidad and Tobago
Head coach:  Zoran Vranes

(N°1)David Austin GK 24/02/1973 Defence Force Football Club Trinidad and Tobago                                                                                                                                                                                                                             
(N°19)Shawn Garcia DF 05/12/1976 Defence Force Football Club Trinidad and Tobago

United States
Head coach:  Steve Sampson

External links 
 Matches and squads at rsssf

CONCACAF Gold Cup squads